Lauren Meece (born 6 February 1983) is an American former judoka who competed in the 2000 Summer Olympics. In an editorial about LGBT Olympians being out at the Olympics she stated that athletes should be allowed to focus on their sports goals without having to be role models. She came out after her competition.

References

1983 births
Living people
American female judoka
Olympic judoka of the United States
Judoka at the 2000 Summer Olympics
Pan American Games medalists in judo
Pan American Games bronze medalists for the United States
Judoka at the 1999 Pan American Games
Medalists at the 1999 Pan American Games
21st-century American women
20th-century American women